Killingworth railway station served the town of Killingworth, Tyne and Wear, England from 1847 to 1965 on the East Coast Main Line.

History 
The station opened on 29 March 1847 by the York, Newcastle and Berwick Railway. The station was situated south of the level crossing on Killingworth Drive on the B1505. From June 1954 the station was closed on Sunday and by summer 1958 there was only one train called in each direction on Monday to Friday, although there were two on Saturday. The station was one of ten to close on 15 September 1958 and closed completely on 7 June 1965 when goods traffic ceased.

References

External links 

Disused railway stations in Tyne and Wear
Former North Eastern Railway (UK) stations
Railway stations in Great Britain opened in 1847
Railway stations in Great Britain closed in 1958
1847 establishments in England
1965 disestablishments in England